Chance Russell Phelps (July 14, 1984 – April 9, 2004) was a private first class – posthumously promoted to lance corporal – in the United States Marine Corps. He served with 2nd Platoon, Battery L, 3rd Battalion, 11th Marine Regiment (3/11), 1st Marine Division, I Marine Expeditionary Force, during Operation Iraqi Freedom.

Phelps was killed in Iraq as the convoy he was escorting came under heavy fire.  His story is the subject of an HBO movie, Taking Chance.

Biography
Phelps was born in Riverton, Wyoming, moved to Craig, Colorado as a young boy, and then again to Clifton, Colorado where he graduated from Palisade High School in 2003. He was motivated to join the Marines by the events of September 11, 2001. After attending recruit training at MCRD San Diego, he attended artillery school at Fort Sill, Oklahoma. He was finally assigned to 3/11, with which he deployed in February 2004.

Death
Phelps was killed in action at approximately 13:30 on April 9, 2004 (Good Friday) at the age of 19, outside Ar Ramadi, Iraq. Phelps's unit was conducting convoy escort (including the assistant commander of the 1st Marine Division, Brigadier General John F. Kelly) when they came under heavy small arms fire, including rocket-propelled grenades. Despite being wounded, he refused to be evacuated, and instead manned his M240 machine gun (also reported to have been a M2 .50 caliber machine gun) to cover the evacuation of the rest of his convoy. Upon withdrawal, he sustained his fatal wound to the head.

Honors
Phelps was buried in Dubois, Wyoming, on April 17, 2004, with full military honors. His remains were escorted home by Lt. Col. Michael Strobl, whose accounts of the escort were recorded in an article he wrote titled "Taking Chance". In attendance were his parents, stepparents, sister, the Chief of Naval Intelligence (for whom his sister was an aide), and every veterans organization within . Several days later, a memorial service was held in Camp Ramadi, Iraq, by his unit. Some time after that, Phelps was officially awarded a posthumous promotion to lance corporal. Approximately the same time, a baseball field constructed in Camp Ramadi was dedicated Phelps Field. In mid-2005, a mess hall at Marine Corps Air Ground Combat Center Twentynine Palms was dedicated Phelps Hall, with his citation posted on a boulder in front. Phelps is also memorialized by a rock garden at the 3/11 office and at the Dubois VFW post, as well as a plaque that travels with Battery L wherever it deploys and a battery mascot named after the Marine.

Awards
Phelps' awards include:

Media attention
Phelps was the subject of a video segment originally broadcast on the News Hour with Jim Lehrer on April 20, 2004: entitled A Fallen Son. PBS ran a segment on Phelps' journey home as part of their Operation Homecoming documentary in the America at a Crossroads series on April 16, 2007.

Taking Chance
An HBO movie based on Strobl's essay of the same name.

References

External links
The Chance Phelps Foundation, a memorial foundation started by the Phelps family
Taking Chance on HBO website
Military Timicles

1984 births
2004 deaths
United States Marines
American military personnel killed in the Iraq War
People from Riverton, Wyoming
People from Dubois, Wyoming
United States Marine Corps personnel of the Iraq War